The Granite Tower is an English language magazine published eight times a year at the start of each semester month by Korea University.

History
The Granite Tower was started by Min Yong-bin, and the first newspaper edition was in September 1954. In 1968, the newspaper was re-established by Park Ik-seo. The Granite Tower became a magazine in 1993 and went online in 1997. The Granite Tower is one of the oldest English language magazine in South Korean universities

References

External links
 The Granite Tower

Defunct magazines published in South Korea
Eight times annually magazines
English-language magazines
Korea University
Magazines established in 1993
Magazines disestablished in 1997
Mass media in Seoul
Online magazines with defunct print editions
Student magazines
Publications established in 1954